Cyclosiella dulciculoides is a moth of the family Erebidae first described by Jeremy Daniel Holloway in 2001. It is found on Borneo. The habitat consists of lowland forests, including swamp forests.

References

External links
Original description: 

Cisthenina
Moths described in 2001